Philip Klitz (7 January 1805 – 12 January 1854) was a British-born composer.

Klitz was born in Lymington, Hampshire. His father, George Philip Klitz,  a drum-major of the royal Flintshire militia, and musical composer, was born at Biebrich, Germany, in 1777, and died at Lymington in 1839. In 1801, he married Elizabeth Lane of Boldre (1775–1838), with whom he had a large family of six sons who became well-known musicians:  
 Philip 
 William, organist of St. Michael's Church, Basingstoke, died 31 May 1857.
 Charles, organist of St. Thomas's Church, Lymington, died 16 February 1864.
 James Frederick, died at Northampton 2 October 1870.
 Robert John (1815-1899)
 John Henry, died 6 December 1880, who by will, founded the Widow and Orphans British and Foreign Musical Society.

Philip, who was the eldest, became a composer of ball-room music at an early age. Around 1829, he took up residence at Southampton where, besides classical music, he produced a variety of ballads of which the words were frequently his own.  He was well-skilled at the violin and pianoforte, and in 1831, he conducted Paganini's performance in Southampton. His lectures on music, given in literary institutions and other places, were well attended, and his advocacy of the Hullah system (see John Pyke Hullah) met with much success.

He was the first organist of St. Lawrence and St Joseph Church, Southampton, and from 1845 to his death, of All Saints' Church. Songs of the Mid-watch, the poetry of Captain Willes Johnson, and the music created for, and dedicated to, the British Navy were published by him in 1838. The admiralty ordered the reprinting of six songs, which were included in a book named "Songs of Charles Dibdin, arranged by T. Dibdin," 1850, pp. 315–20. Aside from his compositions for the piano, in 1850, he wrote a book called "Sketches of Life, Character, and Scenery in the New Forest: a series of Tales, Rural, Domestic, Legendary, and Humorous" as well as other musical compositions. He supported the fraternity, and his song "Faith, Hope, and Charity" is still played before events hosted by Hampshire lodges. He was one of the first people to write songs for the concerts of Ethiopian Serenaders. “Miss Ginger” and “Dinah Dear”, both in 1847, became very popular jingle.

He died at 24 Portland Place, Southampton. His wife was Charlotte Lyte, a half-sister of Henry Francis Lyte. His son, George Klitz, was also a voluminous musical composer.

References

Attribution

1805 births
1854 deaths
People from Lymington
English composers
English people of German descent
19th-century British composers
19th-century English musicians